is a former Japanese football player.

He had previously played for the J2 League team Tokushima Vortis.

Ishihira is a midfielder who plays an attacking role from the wings with good left-footed shots and crosses. He dominates the left side with excellent technique and good physical strength.

In July 2014, he was loaned to fourth tier Regionalliga Nordost club TSG Neustrelitz for the upcoming season.

Club statistics

References

External links

1988 births
Living people
Chukyo University alumni
Association football people from Aichi Prefecture
Japanese footballers
J1 League players
J2 League players
2. Bundesliga players
3. Liga players
Yokohama F. Marinos players
Tokushima Vortis players
OFK Titograd players
FC Erzgebirge Aue players
1. FC Saarbrücken players
Expatriate footballers in Montenegro
Association football midfielders